James Brooks D.D. (or Brookes) (May 1512 – 7 September 1558) was an English Catholic clergyman and Bishop of Gloucester.

Life
Born in May 1512, in Hampshire, southern England, Brooks became a Fellow of Corpus Christi College, Oxford in 1532, took the B.A. that same year and in 1546 the D.D. He was Master of Balliol College, Oxford in the years 1547–1555. He was Vice-Chancellor of the University of Oxford during 1552–3.

Widely known as an eloquent preacher, with the deprivation of John Hooper on the accession of Queen Mary, Brooks succeeded him as Bishop of Gloucester by papal provision in 1554 and was consecrated on 1 April.

In 1555, Brooks was one of the papal sub-delegates in the Royal Commission for the trial of the Oxford Martyrs, Thomas Cranmer, Hugh Latimer, and Nicholas Ridley. Brooks was a man not only of learning but also of integrity. He refused to degrade Ridley, probably on the ground that Ridley's consecration in 1547 had been according to the invalid form which was established by law very soon after that date. If, as the Protestant polemicist John Foxe asserts, Brooks refused to degrade Latimer as well, his position may have been based upon the fact that Latimer had lived for several years as a simple clergyman.

Brooks died in July or August 1558. He was buried in Gloucester Cathedral, but without a monument.

References

Attribution

1512 births
1558 deaths
Clergy from Hampshire
Fellows of Corpus Christi College, Oxford
Masters of Balliol College, Oxford
Vice-Chancellors of the University of Oxford
16th-century English Roman Catholic bishops
Bishops of Gloucester
English people who died in prison custody